Mongolian National University is a private university in Mongolia. Established in 1998 as Chandmani-Erdene College, it was renamed Mongolian National College in 2002, Mongolian National Institute in 2004, and Mongolian National University in 2012.

Background
Mongolian National University (MNU) is located in the Mongolian capital Ulaanbaatar (Ulan Bator). MNU has several campus locations in and outside Ulaanbaatar and operates cooperative, corporate and academic relationships with over 100 universities in over 26 different countries. This includes research institutions and various partners concerning student exchange programs, faculty exchange programs, joint research, and other co-sponsored academic activities. MNU serves as a leader among post -secondary institutions in Mongolia in that it trains its students to create and incubate their own startups.

Mongolian National University's academic curriculum gives current and prospective students a quality theory and practice in multiple languages (Mongolian, English, Korean, Chinese, Russian and other academic language options) in order for students to build towards solid life and workplace fluency.

History
Established in 1998, the Mongolian National University (MNU) is the largest non-governmental university in Mongolia. MNU has multiple faculties, schools of learning and academic programs.

In 2019, over 14,000 undergraduate and graduate students from all Mongolian provinces chose MNU as their university. MNU has 50 different faculties, departments and schools. Students can select from the 100 undergraduate, graduate and postgraduate programs at the MNU. Over 8100 students have graduated from MNU. Over ninety percent of MNU graduates are employed. Primarily in the private sphere.

MNU has various cooperation agreements with university partners from South Korea, Russia, China, Japan, the United States, Taiwan, Norway, Italy, India and Canada. As a result, MNU offers numerous student exchange programs and faculty exchanges for lectures, academic studies and assorted research work.

Criticism
Mongolian National University (MNU) and the National University of Mongolia (NUM) have sometimes been taken for the same university. NUM serves as a public or government university, whereas MNU is a private innovation university. Each university has its own unique geography and campus locales. The two universities have their own unique institutional visions, mission directions, programs and purposes.

Timeline
 1998 Institution Founded
 1999 School of Law founded
 2000 School of Economics and Management founded
 2004 School of Tourism Management founded
 2005 School of International Relations founded
 2007 School of Mathematics and Information Technology founded
 2008 School of Mining and Construction Engineering founded
 2010 Certified by the Global Quality Management Standard Organization
 2011 Membership (ACBSP)
 2013 School of Construction and Engineering founded
 2013 School of International Management of Technology (IT) founded
 2014 Certified by the “Grand Expo -2014” The Best University of the Year
 2015 School of Medicine founded
 2019 School of Nursing founded
 2019 School of Aviation founded
 2019 International Campus opened
 2020 24/7 Research library (new) opened
 2021 University Hospital Phase I laboratories opening

References

Mongolian National University (MNU)

MNU International Campus Video

External links
 University website: muis.mn

Universities in Mongolia
Educational institutions established in 1998
Ulaanbaatar
1998 establishments in Mongolia